Huanca Sancos is a province in central Ayacucho, Peru. On April 3, 1983, Shining Path terrorists entered the town of Lucanamarca and killed 69 people.

Geography 
Some of the highest mountains of the province are listed below:

Political division

Sancos (Huanca Sancos)
Carapo (Carapo)
Sacsamarca (Sacsamarca)
Santiago de Lucanamarca (Lucanamarca)

Ethnic groups 
The people in the province are mainly indigenous citizens of Quechua descent. Quechua is the language which the majority of the population (80.79%) learnt to speak in childhood, while 18.72% of the residents started speaking using the Spanish language (2007 Peru Census).

See also 
 Kinwaqucha
 Ñawpallaqta
 Q'illumayu
 Wamanilla

Sources

External links 
Truth and Reconciliation Commission press release on the Lucanamarca massacre

Provinces of the Ayacucho Region